The Seventh Corps Area was a Corps area, effectively a military district, of the United States Army active from 1920 to 1941. It initially was responsible for army forces in Kansas, Minnesota, Missouri (but not Jefferson Barracks), North Dakota, South Dakota, Iowa and Nebraska. Army responsibility for Arkansas was transferred from the Fourth Corps Area to the Seventh Corps Area on 1 December 1920. In October 1940, the War Department implemented a transfer of tactical command functions of the Corps areas, moving tactical forces to field armies and transforming the Corps areas to Service Commands, themselves part of Army Service Forces. The Seventh Corps Area maintained its name until May 1941, when it was officially designated HQ, Seventh Corps Area Service Command (HQ, Seventh CASC) in May 1941. While the Seventh Corps Area no longer existed, the HQ, Seventh CASClater re-designated HQ, Seventh Service Commandcontinued until January 1944.

Establishment
The command was established on 20 August 1920 with headquarters at Fort Crook, Nebraska from elements of the previous Central Department. HQ, Seventh Corps Area moved to Fort Omaha, Nebraska, on 27 May 1922 and seven years later moved to the Army Building at 15th and Dodge Streets in Omahathe Omaha Army Depoton 25 March 1929.

Structure
The Seventh Corps Area was responsible for the mobilization, administration, and training of units of the: 
Third and Sixth Armies, including the mobile formations and units in the corps area;
VII Army Corps (Headquarters St. Louis, 1922–33;  Omaha, Nebraska, 1933–40) 
7th Division (with its 14th Infantry Brigade active and a designated concentration area at Fort Snelling, MN); 
34th Division (allotted to the National Guard of Iowa,  Minnesota, South Dakota, and North Dakota, assigned to the VII Army Corps in 1921. HQ, 34th Division was reorganized and federally recognized on 14 July 1924 at Council Bluffs, Iowa. The division had its first opportunity to operate as a whole in the interwar period at Camp Ripley in August 1937);
35th Division;
XVII Army Corps (88th Division, 89th Division, 102d Division (Arkansas and Missouri));
General Headquarters Reserve units;
and Seventh Corps Area Support Command Zone of the Interior support units. 

The 1st Observation Squadron joined the Corps Area on 15 June 1937, transferred from the Sixth Corps Area. It took up station at Fort Omaha, Kansas. However the squadron was reassigned to the Cavalry School around 1939.

Division areas
For the administration of units of the Organized Reserve, Seventh Corps Area was originally organized into three division areas (88th, 89th, and 102d) and all divisional units, except cavalry, were administered by the headquarters of those three divisions. Cavalry units were administered by the 66th Cavalry Division (United States), and nondivisional units were administered by the Corps Area headquarters. On 27 January 1923, the HQ, Non-Divisional Group was established at the Army Building in Omaha to administer corps-level and army-level units. But eight months later, HQ, Non-Division Group was discontinued, on 21 August 1925, and the Corps Area HQ took back responsibility for the remainder of the corps-level and army-level units. Two months later, the HQ, Artillery Group, was established 19 October 1925 at Sioux City, Iowa. The Artillery Group controlled only the corps- and army-level coast and field artillery units, while the Corps Area headquarters retained responsibility for the remainder of the corps- and army-level units. The Artillery Group was discontinued on 1 October 1937. On 2 November 1937, the Seventh Corps Area was divided into three “military areas,” and they assumed control of the artillery units within their zones of responsibility. The First Military Area assumed control of the 88th Division area, the Second Military Area assumed control of the 89th Division area, and the Third Military Area assumed control of the 102d Div. area. 

Headquarters Seventh Corps Area began functioning as a service command headquarters in October 1940, and was redesignated HQ, Seventh CASC in May 1941. It was further redesignated HQ, Seventh Service Command on 22 July 1942.

Major posts and installations in the corps area included Fort Crook, Nebraska; Fort Des Moines, Iowa; Fort Leavenworth, Kansas, which was established in May 1827, and included the Sherman Field airfield; Fort Lincoln, North Dakota, in Bismarck, ND; Fort Meade, SD, two miles west of Sturgis, SD; Fort Omaha, NE; Fort Riley, Kansas, which included the Marshall Field airfield; Plattsmouth Rifle Range, NE, eight miles southeast of Fort Crook, and Fort Robinson, near Crawford, Nebraska.

Commanders
The officers who commanded the Seventh Corps Area during its existence included: 

Maj. Gen. Omar Bundy 1 September 1920–11 February 1922
Maj. Gen. Francis J. Kernan 28 May 1922–15 September 1922
Maj. Gen. George B. Duncan 16 September 1922–10 October 1925
Maj. Gen. Benjamin A. Poore 15 October 1925–1 June 1927
Maj. Gen. Harry A. Smith 6 June 1927–21 May 1929
Brig. Gen. Edward L. King 21 May 1929–11 July 1929
Brig. Gen. Stuart Heintzelman 11 July 1929–26 August 1929
Maj. Gen. Johnson Hagood 26 August 1929–2 October 1933
Maj. Gen. Frank R. McCoy 3 October 1933–1 February 1935
Maj. Gen. Stuart Heintzelman 1 February 1935–6 July 1935
Maj. Gen. Frank C. Bolles 30 July 1935–30 September 1936
Brig. Gen. Charles M. Bundel 30 September 1936–4 October 1936
Maj. Gen. Stanley H. Ford 4 October 1936–31 October 1938
Brig. Gen. Guy V. Henry 1 November 1938–8 January 1939
Maj. Gen. Percy P. Bishop 8 January 1939–8 October 1940
Maj. Gen. Robert C. Richardson Jr. 8 October 1940–17 December 1940
Maj. Gen. George V. Strong 17 December 1940–20 May 1941
Maj. Gen. Frederick E. Uhl 20 May 1941–15 January 1944 (as Seventh Service Command)

References

Sources

Further reading 
John E. Harris, "The Organized Reserves: Their Relation to the Military Policy of the United States," The Military Engineer, Vol. 14, No. 73 (January-February, 1922), pp. 33-37, 40-41 (7 pages).

External links 
Leo Niehorster, Units of the Seventh Corps Area Service Command, 8/7 December 1941

 7
Military units and formations established in 1920
Military units and formations disestablished in 1941